ScienceAtHome is a team of scientists, game developers, designers and visual artists based at Aarhus University, Denmark. ScienceAtHome does research on quantum physics, citizen science and gamification. ScienceAtHome also develops games that contribute to scientific research, and studies how humans interpret information to achieve results superior to some algorithmic approaches.

Most ScienceAtHome games are casual games and require no formal scientific training. Over 150,000. people have contributed to ScienceAtHome citizen science projects by playing games. Research games are also part of a much larger movement of creating serious games that go beyond mere entertainment.

The premise behind such games is that humans are better than computers at performing certain tasks, because of their intuition and superior visual processing. Video games are now being used to channel these abilities to solve problems in quantum physics.

History
The idea of computer players solving quantum problems came to Jacob Sherson's mind while he was doing research at Johannes Gutenberg University, Mainz, in the group of Prof. Immanuel Bloch. The first form of ScienceAtHome was announced in 2012 based on the idea that computer game players could solve quantum problems. It was then called CODER – "Pilot Center for Community-driven Research: Game Assisted Quantum Computing". CODER later grew and evolved into ScienceAtHome with the first game born in 2012 called Quantum Moves.

ScienceAtHome is now part of the Center for Hybrid Intelligence situated at the Department of Management at Aarhus BSS.

Publications
Jacob Sherson gave a speech at TEDxAarhus 2016 called "How to become a quantum physicist in five minutes".

Pinja Haikka, Postdoctoral Researcher in Theoretical Physics, also introduced ScienceAtHome at Women in Science event at Aarhus University, which was published on local television ITV OJ.

ScienceAtHome has been featured in a number of journals such as PNAS and Physical Review Research, and magazines like the Diplomatic Courier and Hosting Advice.

ScienceAtHome has also been featured in the Danish Broadcasting Corporation (DR).

In 2020, Jacob Sherson, ScienceAtHome, won Breakthrough of the Year at the World Science Summit for Breaking the Wall of Hybrid Intelligence.

Projects

Games

References 

2012 establishments in Denmark
Citizen science
Online games